Melón is a municipality in the Galician province of Ourense. It has a population of 1582 (Spanish 2006 Census) and an area of 53.22 km².

References  

Municipalities in the Province of Ourense